Pandoke is a village in Gujranwala District, Punjab, Pakistan. It is located at 32°16'30N 73°51'25E with an altitude of 201 metres (662 feet).

References

Gujranwala District